Aedes pipersalatus is a species complex of mosquito belonging to the genus Aedes. It is found in Sri Lanka, Cambodia, West Pakistan, India, and Thailand. It is a non-vector mosquito species, that can be found from rice field and marshland habitats.

References

External links
Aedes pipersalatus (mosquito) - The Ecological Register

pipersalatus